Venerable Chi Kwang Sunim is a Zen Buddhist nun. She is currently the leader of a small community and forest retreat in Kinglake, Victoria.

Training 
Sunim studied Seon (Zen) meditation in Songgansa under the Zen master Kusan. She also studied under Myongseong Sunim, Proctor of Unmun Sa Temple.

Sunim was ordained as a bhikkhuni in Korea and is associated with the Lotus Lantern International Buddhist Centre in Korea. A bhikkhunī (Pali) or bhikṣuṇī (Sanskrit) is a fully ordained female monastic in Buddhism.

In Blossoms of the Dharma: Living as a Buddhist Nun she writes that “the Korean bhikkhunis have established a systematic, effective way of training new nuns.” This includes a novice period, sutra study schools and then meditation halls or other vocations.

In 1988 she returned to live in Australia but makes bi-annual trips back to South Korea.

Leadership 
Sunim is the chair of the Seon Centre in Kinglake. She has been the chair of the Australian Sangha Association and the Buddhist Council of Victoria. Sunim is involved with intra-Buddhist and interfaith programs.

References 

Living people
20th-century women
Year of birth missing (living people)
Buddhist nuns
Zen Buddhist nuns
Australian Buddhists